Arishima (written: 有島) is a Japanese surname. Notable people with the surname include:

, Japanese comedian and actor
, pen-name of Arishima Mibuma, Japanese writer and painter
, Japanese writer

Japanese-language surnames